Mangurjan is a village in Kishanganj district of Bihar state of India.

See also 
 Mangurjan railway station

References 

Villages in Kishanganj district